mobilEcho, created by GroupLogic, Inc. is a mobile file management system for iPhone and iPad. It was first introduced on May 23, 2011 at TechCrunch Disrupt in New York City. mobilEcho (mE) is information technology (IT) software for securely integrating iPhones, iPads and Android phones and tablets with corporate file servers and networks. mobilEcho is installed on corporate file servers by IT departments and installed on iPhones, iPads and Android phones and tablet computers by users; it allows for storage and secure transfer of files back and forth directly between servers and iPhones, iPads and Android phones and tablets.

mobilEcho is the iOS client for GroupLogic's enterprise file sharing and synching solution, activEcho.

Background 
As of January 2011, Apple Inc. stated that 80% of The Fortune 100 companies have deployed or tested the iPad  due to the consumerization of the enterprise – the trend of new technology emerging within the consumer market first and then spreading into enterprise organizations.  This statistic has increased by 15% since October 2010. The consumerization of the enterprise has allowed employees to bring personal tablet computers, such as iPads, into the work environment and employees use them to connect to the corporate file server and network. This trend has raised security issues within the enterprise, as employees are unable to bring the corporate security infrastructure home with them on iPads. iOS devices currently have no native file system that's accessible by users and are not inherently capable of accessing corporate files without using third-party cloud providers like Dropbox and MobileMe, or by users emailing the files to themselves.  These workarounds have some believe to compromise enterprise security.

mobilEcho Release History 
5.0 (Released: 12 November 2013): mobilEcho is fully localized into English, French, German and Japanese
4.5.2 (Released 18 October 2013): added support for authentication via smart cards (CAC/PIV) using PKard technology licensed from Thursby Software.
4.5 (Released: 21 August 2013)
4.3 (Released: 14 March 2013): added support for the secure MobileIron AppConnect ecosystem
4.2 (Released: 14 February 2013)
4.1 (Released: 7 December 2012)
4.0 (Released: 26 July 2012): added support for access to networked attached storage NAS and Microsoft SharePoint sites including, starting with version 4.5, SharePoint Online for Office 365.
3.7 (Released: 11 June 2012): added support for the secure  Good Technology Good Dynamics ecosystem
3.6 (Released: April 2012)
3.5 (Released: 16 February 2012)
3.0 (Released: 25 October 2011)
2.1 (Released: 13 July 2011)
2.0 (Released: 23 May 2011)

References

Mobile software
IOS software
Utilities for Windows
Network file systems
Data synchronization
Email attachment replacements
File sharing
Remote administration software